Greg Carter may refer to:

 Greg Carter (American football) (born 1954), American football coach and former baseball player
 Greg Carter (filmmaker), American filmmaker
 Greg Carter (theatre director), American theatre director